Columbia High School (CHS) is a four-year public high school located in Lake City, Florida. The school's mascot is the Fighting Tigers and the colors are purple and gold.

History
The school was founded in 1888. The 1921 building, which was replaced in 1957 by a new building on Duval street, is on the National Register of Historic Places. In 1935 the school was accused of cheating in football by playing a 21 year old student who lived outside the county. A judge ordered them to be suspended from the Athletic Association and cancelled the rest of their games.

Censorship
In 1986, despite opposition from the ACLU, the school district banned Chaucer's The Miller's Tale and Aristophanes Lysistrata from the school because of sexual content. This decision was ultimately upheld by the courts in 1989 in the case Virgil v. School Board of Columbia County. A 1993 attempt to ban Of Mice and Men by John Steinbeck was defeated due to the intervention of a local librarian.

Integration
Prior to 1969, Columbia was for White students only. In 1969, when the schools were forced to integrate by federal courts, students from the all-Black Fort White High School were sent to Columbia High School, but the district did not fully integrate Columbia at that time and defied a federal court order to do so in January, 1970. The court allowed them to delay until February. Students from Fort White continued to attend Columbia for over 30 years, when a new Fort White High School was built. In 1979, a Black student was accused of improper behavior towards a White female. The Black student was suspended, which led to a boycott of the school by Black students, and McKinley Jeffers, a Black assistant principal was fired.

Activities
Extra curricular activities at the school include the FIRST Tech Challenge team The Flying Tigers, the Academy of Graphic Design, Academic Team, Athletics, Band, Color Guard, and two chapters of Future Farmers of America. The football program lists regional championships in 1969, 1998 & 2003; made it to the Quarter-Finals in 1975, 1982, 1984, 1988, 1990, 1995, 1999, 2001 & 2002, and one State Championship victory in 1967.

The Columbia High School Marching Band has been ranked superior in the Florida Bandmasters Association's Marching Performance Assessment for 16 years.

Columbia high football has been an important part of the community since it began, it won a state title back in 1967, and were runners-up in 1964 and 1997. It was at one time, the winningest program in the state of Florida.

Columbia high athletics have been competitive over the years winning a total of 8 state titles, and producing many notable alumni in its past.

Sports

State championships
 Boys Basketball: 1947 (Class B)
 Boys Track: 2002 (Class 3A)
 Boys Weightlifting: 1996, 1998, 1999
 Boys Football: 1967 (Class A)

Notable alumni 

 Scott Adams, National Football League (NFL) offensive lineman
 Brian Allen, NFL linebacker
 Jerome Carter, NFL strong safety for the St. Louis Rams. At Columbia, Carter was named the top player in the state by The Gainesville Sun, and the Class 5A Player of the Year by the Florida Association of Coaches.
 Fred P. Cone, American politician who served as the 27th Governor of Florida.
 Gene Cox, former High school coach who graduated from Columbia High and coached at Leon High School and attained a total of 313 wins and was at the time one of the winningest coaches in Florida.
 Shayne Edge, Former American football punter who played college at Florida and in the NFL with the Pittsburgh Steelers
 Grace Elizabeth, American model
 Bobby Fulton, wide receiver for the defending National Champions
 Sampson Genus, NFL center for the Green Bay Packers
 Yatil Green, American football wide receiver at the University of Miami, selected by the Miami Dolphins in the first round (15th overall pick) of the 1997 NFL Draft.
 Randy Jackson (offensive lineman), Former American football offensive tackle who played college at Florida and in the NFL for the Chicago Bears
 Timmy Jernigan, NFL defensive lineman. Played college football at Florida State.
 Michael Kirkman, pitcher for the Texas Rangers
 Trey Marshall, safety for the Denver Broncos
 Kendyll Pope, former NFL linebacker who played for the Indianapolis Colts. At Columbia, Pope was selected for the USA Today All-American first team and as a Parade All-American.
 Pat Summerall, an All-State selection in football and basketball for Columbia High School in the 1940s and the 1946 individual state tennis runner-up. Played 10 seasons in the NFL for the then-Chicago Cardinals and the New York Giants, before starting his career as a broadcaster.
 Laremy Tunsil, American football offensive lineman who played college at Ole Miss, he was then selected by the Miami Dolphins in the first round (13th overall pick) of the 2016 NFL Draft.
 Reinard Wilson, American football linebacker in the National Football League. He was drafted by the Cincinnati Bengals 14th overall in the 1997 NFL Draft. He played college football at Florida State.

References

External links
 School Website
 Columbia High School page at Great Schools

Public high schools in Florida
Schools in Columbia County, Florida
Lake City, Florida
1888 establishments in Florida
Educational institutions established in 1888